Phonaesthetics (also spelled phonesthetics in North America) is the study of beauty and pleasantness associated with the sounds of certain words or parts of words. The term was first used in this sense, perhaps by  during the mid-20th century and derives . Speech sounds have many aesthetic qualities, some of which are subjectively regarded as euphonious (pleasing) or cacophonous (displeasing). Phonaesthetics remains a budding and often subjective field of study, with no scientifically or otherwise formally established definition; today, it mostly exists as a marginal branch of psychology, phonetics, or poetics.

More broadly, the British linguist David Crystal has regarded phonaesthetics as the study of "phonaesthesia" (i.e., sound symbolism and phonesthemes): that not just words but even certain sound combinations carry meaning.

Euphony and cacophony 

Euphony is the effect of sounds being perceived as pleasant, rhythmical, lyrical, or harmonious. Cacophony is the effect of sounds being perceived as harsh, unpleasant, chaotic, and often discordant; these sounds are perhaps meaningless and jumbled together. Compare with consonance and dissonance in music. In poetry, for example, euphony may be used deliberately to convey comfort, peace, or serenity, while cacophony may be used to convey discomfort, pain, or disorder. This is often furthered by the combined effect of the meaning beyond just the sounds themselves.

The California Federation of Chaparral Poets uses Emily Dickinson's "A Bird Came Down the Walk" as an example of euphonious poetry, one passage being "...Oars divide the Ocean, / Too silver for a seam" and John Updike's "Player Piano" as an example of cacophonous poetry, one passage being "My stick fingers click with a snicker / And, chuckling, they knuckle the keys".

Research 
David Crystal's 1995 paper "Phonaesthetically Speaking" explores lists, created by reader polls and individual writers, of English words that are commonly regarded as sounding beautiful, to search for any patterns within the words' phonetics. Frequently recurring example words in these lists include gossamer, melody, and tranquil. Crystal's finding, assuming a British Received Pronunciation accent, is that words perceived as pretty tend to have a majority of a wide array of criteria; here are some major ones:
Three or more syllables (e.g., goss·a·mer and mel·o·dy)
Stress on the first syllable (e.g., góssamer and mélody)
Short vowels (e.g., the schwa, followed in order by the vowels in lid, led, and lad) are favored over long vowels and diphthongs (e.g., as in lied, load, loud)
Three or more manners of articulation (with approximant consonants the most common, followed by stop consonants, and so on)
A perfect example word, according to these findings, is tremulous.

Cellar door 

The English compound noun cellar door has been widely cited as an example of a word or phrase that is beautiful purely in terms of its sound (i.e., euphony) without inherent regard for its meaning. The phenomenon of cellar door being regarded as euphonious appears to have begun in the very early twentieth century, first attested in the 1903 novel Gee-Boy by the Shakespeare scholar Cyrus Lauron Hooper. It has been promoted as beautiful-sounding by various writers; linguist Geoffrey Nunberg specifically names the writers H. L. Mencken in 1920; David Allan Robertson in 1921; Dorothy Parker, Hendrik Willem van Loon, and Albert Payson Terhune in the 1930s; George Jean Nathan in 1935; J. R. R. Tolkien in a lecture, "English and Welsh", delivered in 1955 (in which he described his reverence for the Welsh language and about which he said "cellar doors [i.e. beautiful words] are extraordinarily frequent"; see also Sound and language in Middle-earth); and C. S. Lewis in 1963. Furthermore, the phenomenon itself is touched upon in many sources and media, including a 1905 issue of Harper's Magazine by William Dean Howells, the 1967 novel Why Are We in Vietnam? by Norman Mailer, a 1991 essay by Jacques Barzun, the 2001 psychological drama film Donnie Darko, and a scene in the 2019 movie Tolkien.

The origin of cellar door being considered as an inherently beautiful or musical phrase is mysterious. However, in 2014, Nunberg speculated that the phenomenon might have arisen from Philip Wingate and Henry W. Petrie's 1894 hit song "I Don't Want to Play in Your Yard", which contains the lyric "You'll be sorry when you see me sliding down our cellar door." Following the song's success, "slide down my cellar door" became a popular catchphrase up until the 1930s or 1940s to mean engaging in a type of friendship or camaraderie reminiscent of childhood innocence. A 1914 essay about Edgar Allan Poe's choice of the word "Nevermore" in his 1845 poem "The Raven" as being based on euphony may have spawned an unverified legend, propagated by syndicated columnists like Frank Colby in 1949 and  L. M. Boyd in 1979, that cellar door was Poe's favorite phrase. 

Tolkien, Lewis, and others have suggested that cellar door auditory beauty becomes more apparent the more the word is dissociated from its literal meaning, for example, by using alternative spellings such as Selador, Selladore, Celador, Selidor (an island name in Ursula K. LeGuin's Earthsea), or Salidar (Robert Jordan's Wheel of Time series,) which take on the quality of an enchanting name (and some of which suggest a specifically standard British pronunciation of the word), which is homophonous with "sell a daw."

See also 

Affection (linguistics)
Assimilation (linguistics)
Dissimilation
Epenthesis
Inherently funny word
Japanese sound symbolism
Onomatopoeia 
Phonestheme
Phono-semantic matching
Phonosemantics
Sandhi ("euphonic" rules in Sanskrit grammar)
Vogon poetry
Vowel harmony
Cacofonix

Notes

References

 
Linguistics
Phonology
Phonotactics